Johann Julius Walbaum (30 June 1724 – 21 August 1799) was a German physician, naturalist and fauna taxonomist.

Works
As an ichthyologist, he was the first to describe many previously unknown fish species from remote parts of the globe, such as the Great Barracuda (Sphyraena barracuda), the Chum salmon (Oncorhynchus keta) from the Kamchatka River in Siberia, and the curimatá-pacú (Prochilodus marggravii)  from the São Francisco River in Brazil. 

He was also the first to observe gloves as a preventative against infection in medical surgery. In 1758, the gloves he observed were made from the cecum of the sheep, rather than rubber, which had not yet been discovered.

Legacy
The Natural History Museum in Lübeck, opened in 1893, was based on Walbaum's extensive scientific collection, which was lost during the Second World War.

See also

References

German naturalists
German taxonomists
 01
1724 births
1799 deaths
German ichthyologists
People from Wolfenbüttel
People from Brunswick-Lüneburg
18th-century German physicians
18th-century German zoologists
18th-century German male writers